Afrothrips is a genus of thrips in the family Phlaeothripidae.

Species
 Afrothrips testaceus

References

Phlaeothripidae
Thrips genera